The 2007 UCI Road World Championships - Men's Road Race took place on September 30, 2007. The Championship was won for a second year in succession by the Italian Paolo Bettini, who outsprinted the rest of a five-man group in the final 500 metres. The Russian Alexandr Kolobnev took the silver medal and Stefan Schumacher of Germany captured third place for the bronze medal.

The Championships were hosted by the Germany city of Stuttgart, and featured several laps of a tough circuit, amounting to almost 270 kilometres of racing.

Final classification
September 30, 2007: Stuttgart, 267.4 km (14 laps of 19.1 km each)

Did not finish
124 riders failed to finish the race. Marzio Bruseghin of Italy was disqualified, and José Rodrigues of Portugal did not start the race.

Nation qualification

External links
Race website

References

Men's Road Race
UCI Road World Championships – Men's road race

de:Straßen-Radweltmeisterschaft 2007